Christmas in Kabul is a CBC Christmas special about comedian Rick Mercer going to Afghanistan to bring Christmas cheer to the Canadian troops stationed outside Kabul.

Music stars Damhnait Doyle, Kevin Fox and Tom Cochrane accompanied Mercer to Camp Julien, where many of the troops live in large tents.

It originally aired December 21, 2003, on CBC.

External links 
 

2003 television films
2003 films
Christmas television specials
Kabul
Canadian television specials
Canadian comedy films
Documentary films about the War in Afghanistan (2001–2021)
Afghanistan–Canada relations
Canadian documentary television films
2000s Canadian films